Stephen Jones OBE (born   1957) is a British milliner based in London, who is considered one of the most radical and important milliners of the late 20th and early 21st centuries. He is also one of the most prolific, having created hats for the catwalk shows of many leading couturiers and fashion designers, such as John Galliano at Dior and Vivienne Westwood. His work is known for its inventiveness and high level of technical expertise. Jones co-curated the 2009 exhibition Hats: An Anthology for the Victoria and Albert Museum.

Early life
Stephen Jones was born on the Wirral Peninsula in Cheshire  and educated at Liverpool College. From an early age, his mother instilled in him an appreciation of art by taking him around the Walker Art Gallery, Speke Hall, and to National Trust properties around the North West.

He studied art at foundation level at the High Wycombe College of Art. In 1975 he travelled to London to see the exhibition Fashion from 1900-1939 at the V&A, which inspired him to pursue a career in the fashion industry. This led him to apply to study fashion design under Bobby Hillson, at the Saint Martin's School of Art, London, where he was the sole male student in his year. Although he enjoyed being taught by Peter Lewis Crown, the designer-owner of the London couture house Lachasse, he had little prior sewing experience, and so in order to develop his skills Crown secured Jones a summer placement in Lachasse's tailoring workroom. 

Jones soon requested a transfer to the next-door millinery department presided over by Shirley Hex, but was told he had to make a hat from scratch first. The hat he eventually submitted, his first original millinery creation, was a cardboard pillbox covered in blue crêpe de Chine and trimmed with a plastic iris, sprayed silver that his mother had received as a free gift from a petrol station in the 1960s. In his innocence, Jones had not realised that millinery flowers were traditionally made of silk, but Hex approved the hat, commenting on the flower's modernity. Between 1976 and 1979 Jones spent his summer breaks working for Hex and learning about millinery methods and techniques. Through hats he developed a keen interest in fashion history, particularly the drama and exaggerated glamour of the 1950s.

Jones left Saint Martin's in 1979, the same year that he became a regular attendee of London's Blitz nightclub in Covent Garden for New Romantics and fans of new wave music. Jones had been a Punk while at St Martins, but keenly embraced the New Romantic movement as its drawing of inspiration from historical dress resonated with his thinking. As one of the "Blitz Kids", he hung out with the likes of Spandau Ballet, Duran Duran, Isabella Blow, and Jean Paul Gaultier; and shared a house with Boy George and Grayson Perry, competing with them to wear the most outrageous outfits to Blitz, including a pinstripe suit with stiletto heels. Many of the Blitz Kids became his first clients, with Jones creating outlandish hats for them to wear to the club.

Millinery career
Jones designed a line of hats for Fiorucci in 1979. In 1980, Blitz's owner Steve Strange provided financial backing for Jones' first millinery salon, which opened nearby in the basement of the trendy store PX, Endell Street, Covent Garden on 1 October. It was an instant success, with Jones commenting in 2008: "Overnight, I had a business". On New Year's Eve 1980, Jones had his head shaved by drunk friends, leading him to discover that without hair, his head was a perfect woman's stock size, and that he could become his own fit model, developing all his ideas and designs upon himself.

1982 saw Jones' first Paris fashion show and his first televised show (for the BBC's Riverside) By this point, he was able to count Diana, Princess of Wales as a regular customer, in addition to his clients from Blitz, and had a hat commissioned by the Victoria & Albert Museum for their newly refurbished Costume Court. This was the beginning of Jones' long and fruitful relationship with the V&A, culminating in the Hats: An Anthology exhibition of 2009 that he co-curated with Oriole Cullen. One of his hats appeared on the December 1982 cover of Tatler, the first time his work had featured on a magazine cover; the hat is now in the V&A.

Jones relocated his studio to Lexington Street in 1984. That year, Jean Paul Gaultier invited him to Paris to make hats for his show, his first designs for a Paris couturier, and he also made hats for Thierry Mugler. After their second show together, Gaultier ensured that Jones received full credit for his hats, therefore ensuring that the Paris fashion world was made aware of his work. In 1984 he also sold his first designs to a department store, Bloomingdale's in New York.

Jones was appointed Officer of the Order of the British Empire (OBE) in the 2010 New Year Honours.

Collections
This is a list of Stephen Jones' bi-annual hat collections since 1980. The collections from Fall 1981 to Fall 1984 were unnamed.

 1980: Fall-Winter:  First Collection
 1981: Spring-Summer: The Hanging Gardens of Babylon
 1985: Spring-Summer: Point Zero   Fall-Winter: For The Heart of Woman and the Soul of Man
 1986: Spring-Summer: Passport to Pleasure    Fall-Winter: Heads of State
 1987: Spring-Summer: She  Fall-Winter: Stephen Jones World  +
 1988: Spring-Summer: Sunset on Suburbia  Fall-Winter: Room Service
 1989: Spring-Summer: Ole Steamy  Fall-Winter:  Forty Five Degrees
 1990:  Spring-Summer: Passion on the Pampas  Fall-Winter:  In Orbit
 1991: Spring-Summer: Shriek With Chic  Fall-Winter:  Glamé
 1992: Spring-Summer: The Devil is a Woman   Fall-Winter:  Norma Desmond Lives
 1993: Spring-Summer: Souvenirs   Fall-Winter:  Xanadu
 1994: Spring-Summer: Miss World  Fall-Winter:  Rococo Futura
 1995: Spring-Summer: Legasty Fall-Winter:  Les Girls
 1996: Spring-Summer: Untitled '96  Fall-Winter:  Contours
 1997: Spring-Summer: Lotus Eaters  Fall-Winter:  Murder by Millinery
 1998: Spring-Summer: E=mc2  Fall-Winter:  Millinery Computer
 1999: Spring-Summer: Pic 'n' Mix  Fall-Winter:  Celebrations
 2000: Spring-Summer: Nursery  Fall-Winter:  Blah Blah Blah
 2001:  Spring-Summer: Icon  Fall-Winter:  Queens
 2002:  Spring-Summer: High  Fall-Winter:  North
 2003: Spring-Summer: South  Fall-Winter:  Poseur
 2004: Spring-Summer: Hollywood Regency  Fall-Winter:  La Prima Donna
 2005: Spring-Summer: Handmade in England  Fall-Winter:  Jubilee
 2006: Spring-Summer: Travelogue  Fall-Winter:  Time Travel
 2007: Spring-Summer: Artifice   Fall-Winter:  Shangri-La
 2008: Spring-Summer: Desert Rose  Fall-Winter:  Covent Garden
 2009: Spring-Summer: Albertopolis  Fall-Winter:  VandA
 2010: Spring-Summer: ABC  Fall-Winter:  XYZ
 2011: Spring-Summer: Drifting and Dreaming  Fall-Winter:  Topsy Turvy
 2012: Spring-Summer: Chinoiserie-on-Sea  Fall-Winter:  This is Tomorrow
 2013: Spring-Summer: West  Fall-Winter:  Art School
 2014: Spring-Summer: Carte Blanche  Fall-Winter: Garbo-Gabo 
 2015: Spring-Summer: Hot House  Fall-Winter: Hatsville USA 
 2016: Spring-Summer: The Perfect Hat for...  Fall-Winter: Soho
 2017: Spring-Summer: Shade  Fall-Winter: Haute Couture & Pret-a-Porter 
 2018: Spring-Summer: Hats  Fall-Winter: Crowns
 2019: Spring-Summer: Parfum  Fall-Winter: #tophat
2020: Spring-Summer: 123  Fall-Winter: Its About Time
2021: Spring-Summer: Analogue Fairydust  Fall-Winter: French Kiss
2022: Spring-Summer: Bonnes Vacances  Fall-Winter: Playlist

In 1988 Jones moved again, to Heddon Street. His salon and workshop are based on Great Queen Street, Covent Garden, London as of 2013.

Diffusion lines and non-millinery designs
In 1990, Jones launched a Miss Jones diffusion line for hats, and in 1993, this was followed by Jonesgirl which is exclusive to Japan. The Stephen Jones brand has had a strong presence in Japan since 1990, when Jones struck a licensing deal for T-shirts, cosmetic bags, and handkerchiefs to be manufactured there under his name; this was followed by Stephen Jones Kimonos in 1991, gloves in 1993, sunglasses in 1992, and handbags in 2002.

Jones has occasionally designed garments and accessories other than hats. In 1983 he designed dresses for Susanne Bartsch's shop in SoHo, New York and furs for Sol Feldman Furs, New York, and created his first shoe line for Sergio Rossi in 1987. He has had a lasting success with his scarf range, which was launched in 1988, and continues being sold through his millinery salon as of 2009. He has also experimented with non-fashion mediums, including ceramics in 1985 and interior design in 1991.

Jones designed two mannequins for display at the Simone Handbag Museum in Seoul, South Korea.

Design partnerships

In November 1996, Stephen Jones was the only British milliner to have control of a Paris haute couture millinery studio, or atelier de la modiste, making hats for Galliano's high-profile couture shows at Dior. He has worked with Galliano since 1993. Jones also created Vivienne Westwood's iconic Harris Tweed Crown of 1987. Since the 1980s his hats have been in great demand for multiple shows per season. For the Paris collections in early 1995 alone, he was creating human-hair hats for Nicolas Ghesquière's first collection at Balenciaga and designs for Peter O'Brien at Marcel Rochas and Claude Montana as well as Galliano. In 2008, he made hats for Marc Jacobs, L'Wren Scott, Basso & Brooke, Comme des Garçons, Giles Deacon, Loewe, Pollini and Walter van Beirendonck, in addition to multiple Galliano collections, four per season for Dior and two under Galliano's own label. Throughout his career he has designed hats for the shows of many other designers and couturiers.

Stephen Jones and popular culture
In addition to his hat collections for designers, Jones has undertaken numerous individual high-profile commissions for pop groups, musicians, actors, and other celebrities. He has also been commissioned by a number of companies to create designs for advertisements and promotions.

Music
Grace Jones, Diana Ross, George Michael, Spandau Ballet and Culture Club were among Jones's first high-profile celebrity clients in the 1980s. Jones made a personal appearance in the Culture Club video Do You Really Want to Hurt Me? and went on to create headgear for Wham!, Wet Wet Wet, Madonna, Erasure, Bryan Ferry and Barbra Streisand.

In the 1990s, his client list expanded to include Monie Love, Paula Abdul, U2, The Rolling Stones, Cappella, New Order, Marc Almond, Billy Ray Martin, Take That, Belinda Carlisle, Mike + The Mechanics, Skunk Anansie, Eternal, B*Witched, All Saints, Celine Dion, and Kylie Minogue.

Jones's client list expanded through the first decade of the 21st century to include the Spice Girls, Robbie Williams, Sophie Ellis-Bextor, Hear'Say, Macy Gray, Björk, Steve Strange, Paul Simonon, Will Young, Pink, Tori Amos, Alison Goldfrapp, Christina Aguilera, Rihanna and Usher.

He created the hats for three major tours starting in 2005: Kylie Minogue's Showgirl, Mick Jagger's A Bigger Bang and Marilyn Manson's Against All Gods.

Films
Jones made the hats for Faye Dunaway in Supergirl, and also provided hats to Beverly Hills Cop II and Entrapment. From the 1990s onwards his film commissions became more frequent, including designs for Glenn Close as Cruella de Vil in 101 Dalmatians, the Spice World film, Jurassic Park, Lost in Space, and the hats for Lady Penelope (Sophia Myles) and Parker in Thunderbirds. He created the hats for leading ladies such as Cate Blanchett in Elizabeth: The Golden Age, Keira Knightley in Atonement, Dita Von Teese in The Death of Salvador Dali, and Audrey Tautou in Coco avant Chanel. Tautou reportedly commented during her fitting that Jones's hats made her feel like Coco Chanel, the character she was playing.

Promotions
Jones' first commercial commission was for Liquifruita cough mixture in 1982, followed by the Brazilian Fruit Board in 1983. In 1985, his hats were commissioned for use in campaigns for Batiste and Schwarzkopf hair products, and Jones has since then provided hats for many leading brands in the beauty industry, such as Revlon Boots, Garnier (for Ambre Solaire sun lotion), Yardley of London, Lancôme, MAC Cosmetics, and the 2004 L'Oréal campaign featuring Beyoncé. His work also features in perfume advertisements such as those for Nina Ricci's L'Air Du Temps and Parfums Christian Dior.

Jones hats have been used to promote food and soft drinks, including Chiquita, Twix, St Ivel, Quaker Oats, Ryvita, Golden Wonder, Walker's Sensations, Tango, and Robinson's orange squash. Alcoholic beverages have also been advertised using his hats, beginning with Tennents lager in 1987 and including Tia Maria, Cinzano, Perrier, Boddingtons, and Martini & Rossi.

A number of car companies, such as Peugeot, Ford Motor Company, Nissan Motors, Fiat, and Renault have used his hats in their ad campaigns, as have the Esso fuel company and the Pirelli tires company. Jones has also provided hats for use in financial sector promotional material, including MasterCard, Barclays, and Legal & General; and for miscellaneous other companies including Cellnet, National Panasonic, and Ariston.

Hats: An Anthology
The 2009 exhibition, Hats: An Anthology, held at the V&A from 24 February 2009, was inspired by Cecil Beaton's landmark exhibition, Fashion: An Anthology, held at the V&A in 1971. Beaton's exhibition showcased 1900-1971 garments donated by leading fashion designers of the 20th century and their clients, many of which entered the Museum collection afterwards, and firmly placed fashion within the Museum's remit. Along with Oriole Cullen, V&A Curator of Modern Fashion and Textiles, Jones explored the collections of the V&A and other international collections such as those at the Fashion Museum, Bath and the Hollywood archives of Warner Bros.

The exhibition was based predominantly upon hats from the V&A's collections and Stephen Jones's own archive, but also included loans from museums and collections around the world. The work of up-and-coming milliners such as Noel Stewart and Nasir Mazhar was featured alongside hats by Philip Treacy, Mitza Bricard for Dior, Claude Saint-Cyr for Norman Hartnell and Vladzio d'Attainville for Cristóbal Balenciaga. The exhibition also included hats worn by famous hat-wearers such as Gloria Guinness, Isabella Blow, Anna Piaggi, and Gertrude Shilling, as well as the hats of celebrities including Dita Von Teese, Madonna, and Boy George. Film millinery was also featured, such as Beaton's own designs for the stage and screen versions of My Fair Lady and hats worn by Ava Gardner and Marlene Dietrich. The exhibition launched during London Fashion Week with a lavish party attended by famous clients and admirers of Jones, including Piaggi, Daphne Guinness, Peter Blake, Erin O'Connor and Daisy Lowe.

The exhibition and its accompanying book (also called Hats: An Anthology) were generally well received. A month after opening, record-breaking visitor attendance figures were reported. The Evening Standard gave the exhibition four stars out of five. In the Toronto Star, the exhibition and book were described as a celebration and a delight.

The exhibition subsequently moved to New York City to be shown at the Bard Graduate Center of Decorative Arts, Design History and Material Culture, Bard College, until Spring 2012. For this exhibition, work by New York-based milliners such as Rod Keenan, Jennifer Ouellette, and Eugenia Kim, was incorporated into the show.

See also
 Philip Treacy, Irish milliner based in London

External links

Me and Mr Jones – Stephen Jones Interview – Fascineshion

References

English fashion designers
People from the Metropolitan Borough of Wirral
British milliners
People educated at Liverpool College
1957 births
Living people
Alumni of Saint Martin's School of Art
Officers of the Order of the British Empire
20th-century squatters